"Sunshine in the Rain" is an electronica song performed by Swedish band BWO. The song was released as a sixth single from their first album, Prototype in Sweden, on 15 September 2005.

The single peaked at number 12 on the Swedish single chart. The song also became a Svensktoppen hit, charting for 26 weeks between the period 13 November 2005–7 May 2006, even topping the chart before leaving it. The song also reached at Trackslistan.

The song was covered by Taiwanese pop singer Jolin Tsai under the title "" for the 2007 album Agent J. Jolin's version in the key of C major contrasts with the original in A major.

Charts

References

2004 songs
2005 singles
BWO (band) songs
Songs written by Alexander Bard
English-language Swedish songs
EMI Music Sweden singles
Songs written by Anders Hansson (songwriter)